The 2012 Kyrgyzstan League season was the 21st edition of the Kyrgyzstan League. It started on 14 April 2012 with participation of eight teams. The new official name of the league was Top-Liga.

Clubs

Abdish-Ata Kant
Ala Too Naryn
Alay Osh
Alga Bishkek
Dinamo Bishkek
Dordoi Bishkek
FC-95 Bishkek
Khimik Kara-Balta

League table

Top goal-scorers
The top scorers are:

References

External links

Football League Kyrgyzstan (Russian)

Kyrgyzstan League seasons
1
Kyrgyzstan
Kyrgyzstan